Aynalı is a village in the Düzce District of Düzce Province in Turkey. Its population is 410 (2022). Located 3 kilometers from Prusias ad Hypium, a floor mosaic part of an ancient villa was excavated near the village in 2016. As of December 2020, a team still continues to work in the area to find more pieces.

References

Villages in Düzce District